Angelo Mosso (30 May 1846 – 24 November 1910) is the 19th century Italian physiologist who invented the first neuroimaging technique ever, known as 'human circulation balance'.

Mosso began by recording the pulsation of the human cortex in patients with skull defects following neurosurgical procedures. From his findings that these pulsations change during mental activity, he inferred that during mental activities blood flow increases to the brain. Remarkably, Mosso invented the 'human circulation balance', only recently rediscovered, to non-invasively measure the redistribution of blood during emotional and intellectual activity also in healthy subjects: this is therefore regarded as the first neuroimaging technique ever, forerunner of the more refined techniques of fMRI, and PET.
 
He was born in Turin, studied medicine there and in Florence, Leipzig, and Paris, and was appointed professor of pharmacology (1876) and professor of physiology (1879) at Turin.  He invented various instruments to measure the pulse and experimented and wrote upon the variation in the volume of the pulse during sleep, mental activity, or emotion.  In 1900–01 he visited the United States and embodied the results of his observations in Democrazia nella religione e nella scienza:  studi sull' America (1901).  In 1882 he founded with Emery the Archives Italiennes de Biologie, in which journal most of his essays appeared.  Among his other works are: 
 Die Diagnostik des Pulses (1879)
 Sulla paura  (1884)
 La paura (1891; English translation by E. Lough and F. Kiesow, Fear, London, 1896)
 La fatica (1891; English translation by M. A. and W. B. Drummond, Fatigue, New York, 1904)
 La Temperatura del cervello (1894)
 Fisiologia dell' uomo sulle Alpi (1897; third edition, 1909); English translation, 1898
 Mens Sana in Corpore Sano (1903)
 Vita moderna degli Italiani (1905)
 Escursioni nel mediterraneo e gli scavi di Creta (1907; second edition, 1910; English translation, The Palaces of Crete and their Builders, New York, 1907)
 La preistoria:  original della civilta mediterranea (1910; English translation by M. C. Harrison, The Dawn of Mediterranean Civilization, New York, 1911)
 Nuovo Antologia (in collaboration)

Mosso was elected a member of the Royal Swedish Academy of Sciences in 1897.

Inventions

Mosso's balance, rediscovered by Stefano Sandrone and colleagues
 Mosso's ergograph — (1890) An apparatus for recording the force and frequency of flexion of the fingers
 Mosso's sphygmomanometer —  An instrument for measuring blood pressure in the arteries
The American Illustrated Medical Dictionary (1938)

References

External links

 
 
 
 Biography in English
 Mosso's first neuroimaging experiment ever
 Biography in Italian
 Short biography and bibliography in the Virtual Laboratory of the Max Planck Institute for the History of Science
 Some places and memories related to Angelo Mosso on Himetop – The History of Medicine Topographical Database

1846 births
1910 deaths
Italian physiologists
Italian male writers
19th-century Italian inventors
Physicians from Turin
Members of the Royal Swedish Academy of Sciences